The platform diving was a diving event held as part of the diving at the 1904 Summer Olympics programme.  It was the first time diving events were held at the Olympics. The competition was held on Wednesday, 7 September 1904. Five divers from two nations competed.

Braunschweiger refused to dive-off for the bronze medal so it was only given to Kehoe.

Results

References

Sources
 

P
1904